The Battle of the Giants (BoG) is a football competition held every year, under the auspices of the Fiji Football Association in which the top district teams take part.

The competition, which started in 1978, was due to the foresight of J.D. Maharaj, who saw it as a way of earning money for cash starved football associations in Fiji. This was the first time that a football competition in Fiji was sponsored by businesses. The competition has been held every year except 1987, when restrictions placed by the military government on organised competitions on Sunday led to all soccer competitions in Fiji being abandoned.

Nature of tournament 
The top 10 district teams take part in the tournament. At present these teams are Ba F.C., Labasa F.C., Lautoka F.C., Nadi F.C., Nadroga, Nasinu, Navua, Rewa, Suva and Tavua. The teams are divided into two pools of five and each team plays all the other teams once, over three days. A win is worth three points, a draw one point and a loss no points. The top two teams in each pool qualify for the semi-finals, with the winner of each pool playing the runner-up of the other pool. The semi-finals and the final are played on the different days.

Champions

Most successful teams

External links 
Battle Of Giants Roll of Honour
 The Rec.Sport.Soccer Statistics Foundation.

Football competitions in Fiji
Soccer